Mayhew is an unincorporated community in Mayhew Lake Township, Benton County, Minnesota, United States, near Sauk Rapids.  The community is located near the junction of Benton County Roads 1 and 13.

References

Unincorporated communities in Benton County, Minnesota
Unincorporated communities in Minnesota